Ackworth is a civil parish in the metropolitan borough of the City of Wakefield, West Yorkshire, England.  The parish contains 36 listed buildings that are recorded in the National Heritage List for England.  Of these, one is listed at Grade I, the highest of the three grades, four are at Grade II*, the middle grade, and the others are at Grade II, the lowest grade.  The parish contains the settlements of High Ackworth, Low Ackworth, Ackworth Moor Top, and part of East Hardwick, and the surrounding countryside.  Most of the listed buildings are houses, cottages and associated structures.  The other listed buildings include a church and items in the churchyard, a plague stone or cross base, a village cross, former almshouses, a school and an associated Quaker meeting house, three guide posts, and two mileposts, 


Key

Buildings

References

Citations

Sources

 

Lists of listed buildings in West Yorkshire